Willi Danklmaier was an Austrian luger who competed from the early 1980s to the early 1990s. A natural track luger, he won two medals in the men's singles at the FIL World Luge Natural Track Championships (Silver: 1992, Bronze: 1984).

Danklmaier also won two medals at the FIL European Luge Natural Track Championships with a silver in singles in 1993 and a bronze in doubles in 1981.

References

Natural track European Championships results 1970-2006.
Natural track World Championships results: 1979-2007

Austrian male lugers
Living people
Year of birth missing (living people)